CIPC is an abbreviation which may refer to:

CIPC-FM, radio station
Companies and Intellectual Property Commission, South African government agency
Chlorpropham, a plant growth regulator also known as CIPC
Cleveland International Piano Competition, an international classical music competition
International Centre for the Prevention of Crime, a global non-profit organization